Chinati is an unincorporated community in Presidio County, Texas, United States.
It is named after the surrounding Chinati Mountain Range. The word "chinati" derives from the Apache word ch'íná'itíh, which means gate or mountain pass.

Education
Chinati is zoned to schools in the Presidio Independent School District.

References

External links
 
 

Unincorporated communities in Presidio County, Texas
Unincorporated communities in Texas